Kentucky Route 695 (KY 695) is a  state highway in southwestern Christian County, Kentucky, that runs from KY 164 northeast of Peedee to the southbound lanes of KY 107 in downtown Hopkinsville via Church Hill.

Major intersections

References

0695
0695